Events in the year 2021 in Austria.

Incumbents

 President: Alexander Van der Bellen (since 26 January 2017)
 Chancellor: 
 Sebastian Kurz (until 11 October) 
 Alexander Schallenberg (from 11 October), (until 6 December)
 Karl Nehammer (from 6 December)

Governors
 Burgenland: Hans Peter Doskozil
 Carinthia: Peter Kaiser
 Lower Austria: Johanna Mikl-Leitner
 Salzburg: Wilfried Haslauer Jr.
 Styria: Hermann Schützenhöfer
 Tyrol: Günther Platter
 Upper Austria: Thomas Stelzer
 Vienna: Michael Ludwig
 Vorarlberg: Markus Wallner

Events

October 

 9 October: Sebastian Kurz resigns from the chancellorship.
 11 October: President Alexander Van der Bellen officially removed Kurz from office and appointed then-Foreign Minister Alexander Schallenberg as chancellor of Austria.

December 
 6 December: Nehammer government is formed.

Deaths
22 July – Peter Rehberg, British-born electronic musician (KTL), heart attack (b. 1968).

References

 
2020s in Austria
Years of the 21st century in Austria
Austria
Austria